Kinglake is the surname of the following notable people:
Alexander William Kinglake (1809–1891), English travel writer and historian
John Alexander Kinglake (1802–1870), English barrister and Liberal politician 
Robert Kinglake (1843–1915), English rower and barrister
Robert Kinglake (physician) (1765–1842), English physician

English-language surnames